Black Creek in Ontario may refer to one of 37 creeks of that name:
In Algoma District:
Black Creek, NTS map sheet 041J02
Black Creek, NTS map sheet 041J05
Black Creek, NTS map sheet 041J07
Black Creek, NTS map sheet 041J14
Black Creek, NTS map sheet 041K15
Black Creek in Bruce County, NTS map sheet 041A14
Black Creek in Dufferin County, NTS map sheet 040P16
Black Creek in the Regional Municipality of Durham, NTS map sheet 030M15
Black Creek in Frontenac County, NTS map sheet 031C15
Black Creek in Haliburton County, NTS map sheet 031D15
Black Creek in the Regional Municipality of Halton, NTS map sheet 030M12
Black Creek in Huron County, NTS map sheet 040P05
In Lambton County:
Black Creek, NTS map sheet 031F02
Black Creek, NTS map sheet 040J09
In Lanark County:
Black Creek (Big Rideau Lake)
Black Creek, CGNDB code FAJFW, near Smith's Falls
Black Creek, CGNDB code FAJHV, a tributary of the Clyde River
Black Creek in Leeds and Grenville United Counties, NTS map sheet 031C08
Black Creek in Lennox and Addington County, NTS map sheet 031C07
Black Creek in Manitoulin District, NTS map sheet 041G09, a tributary of Blue Jay Creek
Black Creek in Muskoka District, NTS map sheet 31000000
Black Creek in Norfolk County, NTS map sheet 040I16
Black Creek in Ottawa, NTS map sheet 031G06
Black Creek in Oxford County, NTS map sheet 040P07
Black Creek in Parry Sound District, NTS map sheet 041H15
Black Creek in the Regional Municipality of Peel, NTS map sheet 030M13
In Perth County:
Black Creek, NTS map sheet 040P06
Black Creek, NTS map sheet 040P10
In Prescott and Russell United Counties:
Black Creek, NTS map sheet 031G06
Black Creek, NTS map sheet 031G07
Black Creek in Prince Edward County, NTS map sheet 030N14
In Renfrew County
Black Creek, NTS map sheet 031F11
Black Creek, NTS map sheet 031L01
In Stormont, Dundas and Glengarry United Counties:
Black Creek, NTS map sheet 031B14
Black Creek, NTS map sheet 031G03
Black Creek in Sudbury District, NTS map sheet 041J01
Black Creek (Toronto)
Black Creek in Welland County, NTS map sheet 030L14

See also  
List of rivers of Ontario

References

Search at the Geographical Names Board of Canada Geonames Query web site with parameters "Name : Black Creek * Feature type : RIV Province/Territory : ON". Retrieved 2010-08-29.

Rivers of Ontario